Markiyan Volodymyrovych Ivashko (Ukrainian: Маркіян Володимирович Івашко; born May 18, 1979) is a Ukrainian archer.

2008 Summer Olympics
At the 2008 Summer Olympics in Beijing, Ivashko finished his ranking round with a total of 658 points, which gave him the 32nd seed for the final competition bracket in which he faced Daniel Morillo in the first round. The Spanish archer won the match by 115–107. Morillo would be eliminated in the following round by Juan René Serrano.

Together with Oleksandr Serdyuk and Viktor Ruban he also took part in the team event. With his 658 score from the ranking round combined with the 678 of Ruban and the 676 of Serdyuk, Ukraine was in second position after the ranking round, which gave them a straight seed into the quarter finals. With 214–211 they were too strong for the Chinese Taipei team, but in the semi final they were eliminated by Italy, 223–221. In the challenge for the bronze medal China was too strong with 222–219.

2012 Summer Olympics

At the 2012, Ivashko was knocked out in the last 16 of the men's individual competition and he was part of the Ukrainian team that was knocked out at the quarter finals stage of the men's team competition.

References

1979 births
Living people
Sportspeople from Lviv
Ukrainian male archers
Archers at the 2008 Summer Olympics
Archers at the 2012 Summer Olympics
Olympic archers of Ukraine
Archers at the 2015 European Games
European Games medalists in archery
European Games gold medalists for Ukraine
Lviv State University of Physical Culture alumni
21st-century Ukrainian people